Trombidium mediterraneum is a species of mite in the genus Trombidium in the family Trombidiidae. It is found in Europe and Algeria.

References
 Synopsis of the described Arachnida of the World: Trombidiidae

Further reading
  (1910): Lista di nuove specie e nuovi generi di Acari.

Trombidiidae
Arachnids of Europe
Arthropods of North Africa
Animals described in 1910